Ernst Jandl (1 August 1925 – 9 June 2000) was an Austrian writer, poet, and translator. He became known for his experimental lyric, mainly sound poems (Sprechgedichte) in the tradition of concrete and visual poetic forms.

Poetry 

Influenced by Dada he started to write experimental poetry, first published in the journal Neue Wege ("New Ways") in 1952.

He was the life partner of Friederike Mayröcker. In 1973 he co-founded the Grazer Autorenversammlung in Graz, became its vice president in 1975 and was its president from 1983 to 1987.

His poems are characterized by German language word play, often at the level of single characters or phonemes.  For example, his famous univocalic poem "ottos mops" (in English, "otto's pug") uses only the vowel "o". Of course, poems like this cannot easily be translated into other languages.

Most of his poems are better heard than read.  His lectures were always known as very impressive events, because of the particular way he pronounced his poems. Poems like "schtzngrmm" (his version of the word "Schützengraben" which describes the trenches of the World War I)  can be understood only if read correctly. It is an experimental poem in which he tells the sounds of war only with combinations of letters, which sound like gunfires or detonating missiles.

He translated Gertrude Stein, Robert Creeley's The Island, and John Cage's  Silence.

Some other of his best-known poems are "lichtung" (also known as "lechts & rinks", in English "light & reft") and "kneiernzuck".

An example of a short poem, written in English:

three wives
i never remember my second wife
i never remember my third wife
i always remember what i always remember
ain't ever even had a first wife

Awards 
 1969: Hörspielpreis der Kriegsblinden with Friederike Mayröcker for "Five Men"
 1974: Georg-Trakl-Preis (see Georg Trakl)
 1976: Literature Prize of the City of Vienna
 1978: Austrian Prize for Literature
 1980: Mülheim Dramatists Prize
 1982: Anton Wildgans Prize
 1982: Manuscripts Prize of Styria
 1984: Georg Büchner Prize (see Georg Büchner)
 1984: Grand Austrian State Prize for Literature
 1985: Preis der deutschen Schallplattenkritik
 1986: Gold Medal of Vienna
 1987: Kassel Literary Prize for Grotesque Humour
 1988: German Cabaret Award
 1989: Frankfurt Hörspielpreis
 1990: Austrian Decoration for Science and Art
 1990: Peter-Huchel-Preis
 1993: Kleist Prize
 1995: Friedrich-Hölderlin-Preis (see Friedrich Hölderlin)
 1995: Medal of the Province of Styria
 1996: Grand Decoration of Honour in Gold for Services to the Republic of Austria

Poems 
"Ottos Mops" 20 November 1963
"Laut und Luise" 1966
"sprechblasen" 1968
"der künstliche baum" 1970
"idyllen" 1989
"Aus dem wirklichen Leben" 1999
Reft and Light (Providence, RI: Burning Deck, 2000); translated from the German by various American poets,

Books 
 lechts und rinks. gedichte, statements, peppermints; Luchterhand, in a poor translation: "light and reft. poems, statements, peppermints"
 laut und luise; Luchterhand, 
 Interpretationen, Gedichte von Ernst Jandl; Reclam, 
 ernst jandl, aus dem wirklichen Leben: gedichte und prosa, with 66 drawings by Hans Ticha, Büchergilde Gutenberg 2000,

Notes

References

External links 

Writing is the food of the gods  Friederike Mayröcker's poem about her companion at signandsight.com
Ernst Jandl at UbuWeb sound files to download and discussion of his concrete poetry at UbuWeb
author page at Lyrikline.org, with audio, text (German, one translation into English).

1925 births
2000 deaths
Anton Wildgans Prize winners
Writers from Vienna
Burials at the Vienna Central Cemetery
Kleist Prize winners
Georg Büchner Prize winners
Recipients of the Austrian Decoration for Science and Art
Recipients of the Grand Austrian State Prize
Recipients of the Grand Decoration for Services to the Republic of Austria
20th-century Austrian poets
Austrian male poets
Members of the Academy of Arts, Berlin
German-language poets
20th-century Austrian male writers
Visual poets